Prof Douglas McKie FRSE FRIC FSA (1896–1967) was a British chemist and science historian. He was a member of the International Academy of the History of Science, the Society for the History of Alchemy and Chemistry, and the Society of Apothecaries.

Life
He was born on 15 July 1896 in Tredegar in Wales. He was the son of James McKie of Port William in Scotland, and his wife, Janet Moseley. His father was an officer in the South Wales Borderers and after local education he was sent to the Royal Military Academy Sandhurst to train as an army officer and follow in his father’s footsteps.
He was commissioned as a lieutenant in the South Wales Borders in 1916, and joined the troops on the Western Front in Flanders, as part of the First World War. However, his military career came to an abrupt end in July 1917, when he was severely injured during an attack on the Germans in the early days of the Battle of Passchendaele. After more than a year in hospital he rejoined his regiment in 1919 as part of the occupying forces in Germany.

He resigned his commission in 1920 and instead took up a new career in Chemistry, studying at the University of London. He graduated BSc in 1923. He did further post-graduate research, gaining both a PhD and DSc. He was on the staff of the University of London from 1924 and gained his professorship in 1957, teaching the History and Philosophy of Science.

In 1922 McKie married Mary Smith, who had been his wartime nurse. They had one child, Duncan, a mineralogist, who became a fellow of Jesus College, Cambridge.

In 1958 he was elected a Fellow of the Royal Society of Edinburgh. His proposers were Herbert Turnbull, W. P. D. Wightman, Monteath Wright and James Pickering Kendall.
In 1963 he was the recipient of the Dexter Award for Outstanding Achievement in the History of Chemistry from the American Chemical Society due to his work on both Joseph Black and Lavoisier.

He retired in 1964 and died in London on 28 August 1967.

Publications

The Discovery of Specific and Latent Heat (1935)
Thomas Cochrane’s Notes from Dr Black’s Lectures on Chemistry 1767/8 (1936)
Antoine Lavoisier: The Father of Modern Chemistry (1936)
Newton and Chemistry (1943)
Antoine Lavoisier: Scientist, Economist and Social Reformer (1953)

In 1936 he was co-founder of the journal Annals of Science and he served as its Editor until his death.

The French awarded him Chevalier of the Légion d'honneur in 1957 for his work on Lavoisier.

References

1896 births
1967 deaths
Alumni of the University of London
Academics of the University of London
British science writers
20th-century British historians
British chemists
Fellows of the Royal Society of Edinburgh
People from Tredegar
Historians of science